The following is a list of notable deaths in April 2006.

Entries for each day are listed alphabetically by surname. A typical entry lists information in the following sequence:
 Name, age, country of citizenship at birth, subsequent country of citizenship (if applicable), reason for notability, cause of death (if known), and reference.

April 2006

1

Gary Dineen, 62, Canadian ice hockey player and coach.
Annesley Kingsford, 93, Canadian rower and Olympian.
 In Tam, 83, Cambodian politician.
 Oscar Treadwell, 79, American jazz radio journalist and presenter.

2

Sir Anthony Beaumont-Dark, 73, British politician, former Conservative Member of Parliament.
Mohammed al-Maghout, 72, Syrian poet and playwright.
Bernard Seigal, 48, American musician and essayist with the stage name Buddy Blue, co-founder of the Beat Farmers, heart attack.
Nina von Stauffenberg, 92, German widow of Hitler's would-be assassin.

3

Tom Abercrombie, 75, American National Geographic photographer, complications from open-heart surgery.
Barry Bingham, Jr., 72, American television and radio executive, former editor and publisher of the Louisville Courier-Journal and the Louisville Times.
Lou Carrol, 83, American traveling salesman, gave Checkers to Richard Nixon.
Doug Coombs, 48, American extreme skier, ski accident in the French Alps.
Ewan Fenton, 76, Scottish footballer.
Martin Gilks, 41, English musician, former drummer with The Wonder Stuff, motorcycle accident.
Marshall Goldberg, 88, American football player, former NFL running back of the Chicago Cardinals, complications due to a head injury.
Albert Harker, 95, American soccer player, last surviving member of the US 1934 FIFA World Cup soccer team.
Genzō Murakami, 96, Japanese novelist.
Walter Ristow, 97, American map librarian at the New York Public Library and the Library of Congress.
Sir Andrew Stark, 89, British diplomat, Ambassador to Denmark (1971–1976).
Ida Vos, 74, Dutch writer.

4

Mary Boyce, 85, British authority on Iran.
Toddie Byrne, 71, Irish politician.
Fred Christensen, 84, American fighter ace in World War II.
Eckhard Dagge, 58, former German WBC junior middleweight champion.
Sir Roy Denman, 81, British civil servant and diplomat.
Denis Donaldson, 55/56, British former head of Sinn Féin at Stormont, and British double-agent, found shot dead at his home.
Gary Gray, 69, American child actor of the 1940s, cancer.
John de Courcy Ireland, 94, Irish maritime historian and political activist.
John George Macleod, 90, Scottish physician.
Jürgen Thorwald, 90, German writer.
Vickery Turner, 61, British actress of the 60's.
Frederick B. Williams, 66, American minister of the Church of the Intercession in Harlem, New York City.

5

Alain de Boissieu, 91, French General and son-in-law of Charles De Gaulle.
J. B. Fuqua, 87, American entrepreneur and philanthropist.
George Savalla Gomes, 90, Brazilian entertainer who performed as "Carequinha" the clown.
Allan Kaprow, 78, American artist and art theorist, natural causes.
Armando Labra, 62, Mexican economist.
Pasquale Macchi, 82, Italian Roman Catholic archbishop, former private secretary to Pope Paul VI.
Abdul-Salam Ojeili, 88, Syrian novelist.
Gene Pitney, 66, American singer and songwriter, heart disease.

6

Jim Clack, 58, American NFL offensive guard, heart failure.
Maggie Dixon, 28, American women's basketball coach at United States Military Academy, cardiac arrhythmia.
Francis L. Kellogg, 89, American diplomat.
Leslie Norris, 84, Welsh poet and professor at Brigham Young University.
Lucie 'Anne' Pere-Pucheu, 112, French supercentenarian.

7

Roger Arnaldez, 94, French professor of Islamic studies.
Bobbie Nudie, 92, American fashion designer, wife of Nudie Cohn.
Jim Clack, 58, American gridiron football player, heart attack.
Adamas Golodets, 72, Soviet football player and manager.
Théogène Ricard, 96, Canadian politician.

8

Henry Lewy, 79, German-American sound engineer and record producer.
 Richard Pearlman, 68, American theatre and opera director, director of the Lyric Opera Center for American Artists.
Gerard Reve, 82, Dutch author (The Evenings, The Fourth Man), Alzheimer's disease.
Valentine Telegdi, 84, Hungarian-American physicist.

9

Christian Compton, 76, American jurist, justice of the Supreme Court of Virginia.
Frank Gibney, 81, American writer and journalist on Asia.
Billy Hitchcock, 89, American Major League Baseball infielder, coach, manager, and scout, natural causes.
Robin Orr, 96, Scottish classical composer and conductor.
Jimmy Outlaw, 93, American baseball third baseman/outfielder.
Georges Rawiri, 74, Gabonese politician, president of the Senate and former foreign minister.
Hermann Schild, 93, German cyclist, National Champion (1954).
Vilgot Sjöman, 81, Swedish film director (I Am Curious (Yellow)), complications from brain haemorrhage.
Natalia Troitskaya, 55, Russian operatic soprano.

10

Joe Faragalli, 76, Canadian Football League head coach with the Saskatchewan Roughriders and Edmonton Eskimos.
Bonaya Godana, 54, Kenyan politician, plane crash. 
Bishop Charles Henderson, 81, Irish retired Catholic Auxiliary Bishop of Southwark, England, KC*HS, cancer.

11

Leonard Dommett, 77, Australian violinist and conductor.
Les Foote, 81, Australian Football Hall of Fame member.
DeShaun Holton, 32, American rapper better known as 'Proof' of D-12, homicide.
Siobhán O'Hanlon, 43, Northern Irish Sinn Féin politician, cancer.
Winand Osiński, 92, Polish Olympic runner.
June Pointer, 52, American singer, former member of The Pointer Sisters, lung cancer.
Shin Sang-ok, 80, Korean film producer, liver problems.
Sergey Tereshchenkov, 67, Soviet Olympic cyclist.
Angus Wells, 63, English fiction writer.

12

Muhsin Musa Matwalli Atwah, 41, Egyptian militant, killed by Pakistani forces.
Richard Bebb, 79, British actor.
William Sloane Coffin, 81, American minister and peace activist, congestive heart failure.
Andy Duncan, 83, American basketball player.
Paulina Kernberg, 71, Chilean-born American child psychiatrist, professor at Cornell University.
Kazuo Kuroki, 75, Japanese film director.
Shekhar Mehta, 60, Kenyan rally driver, five-time winner of the Safari Rally & president of the FIA's World Rally Championship commission, illness relating to complications from an old injury.
Puggy Pearson, 77, American poker player.
Albert E. Radford, 88, American botanist.
Rajkumar, 76, Indian actor, cardiac arrest.
William Woo, 69, first Asian-American to be editor of a major American daily newspaper, the St. Louis Post-Dispatch, professor at Stanford University.

13

John Read, 85, British television producer and cinematographer.
Dame Muriel Spark, 88, British novelist, (The Prime of Miss Jean Brodie).
Bruce Weber, 54, Australian rules football executive who was president of the Port Adelaide Football Club.
Arthur Winston, 100, American Los Angeles County Metropolitan Transportation Authority employee, famous for serving for 76 years and retiring at age 100.

14

Mahmut Bakalli, 70, Kosovo ethnic Albanian politician.
Henry Callow, Isle of Man jurist.
A. B. A. Ghani Khan Choudhury, 78, Indian politician.
Tom Ferguson, 62, American medical doctor and author.
Miguel Reale, 95, Brazilian philosopher of law, heart attack.
Eberhardt Rechtin, 80, American electrical engineer and telecommunications expert.

15

Raúl Corrales, 81, Cuban photographer .
Lord Eliot (Jago Eliot), 40, English aristocrat, surfer and cyber artist, epilepsy.
Calum Kennedy, 77, Scottish traditional singer.
Pavel Koutecký, 49, Czech documentary film maker, accidental fall.
Louise Smith, 89, American NASCAR racer, first woman inducted into the International Motorsports Hall of Fame, known as "the first lady of racing," complications from cancer.
 Vusumzi Make, 75, South African politician

16
 
Francisco Adam, 22, Portuguese actor, traffic collision.
Lorraine Borg, 82, American baseball player (AAGPBL)
Philippe Castelli, 80, Franch actor.
Richard Eckersley, 65, English graphic designer.
Morton Freedgood, 93, American author (The Taking of Pelham One Two Three) under the pseudonym of John Godey.
Brett Goldin, 27, South African actor, killed by a head shot together with friend, fashion designer Richard Bloom, 27.
Poopak Goldarreh, 34, Iranian actress, traffic collision.
Harold Horwood, 82, Canadian writer and former Newfoundland politician, cancer.
Stephen Marshall, 20, American double murderer, suicide.
Daniel Schaefer, 70, American politician, former Republican United States Representative from Colorado served 1983–1999, cancer.
Jake Seamer, 92, English cricketer.
Silvia Caos, 72, Cuban-Mexican actress.

17

Jean Bernard, 98, French hematologist.
Scott Brazil, 50, American television producer and director (The Shield), Lou Gehrig's disease.
Peter Cadbury, 88, British entrepreneur and one of the founders of commercial TV broadcasting in the UK.
Elford Albin Cederberg, 88, American politician, former Republican United States Representative from Michigan from 1953 to 1978 and former mayor of Bay City, Michigan.
Henderson Forsythe, 88, American actor (As the World Turns).
Arthur Hertzberg, 84, Polish-born American rabbi and scholar of Judaism.
Vaishnavi, 20, Indian Bollywood actress, suicide.

18

Bindhyabasini Devi, 86, Indian folk singer.
Ken Jones, 84, Welsh rugby union player, Wales and British Lion rugby union player and silver medal Olympiad.
John Lyall, 66, British football manager with West Ham United F.C. and Ipswich Town F.C., heart attack.
Grady McWhiney, 77, American historian.
Dick Rockwell, 85, American cartoonist, assistant on Steve Canyon, nephew of Norman Rockwell.

19
John F. Cosgrove, 56, American politician, member of the Florida House of Representatives.
Scott Crossfield, 84, American X-15 test pilot, plane crash.
Bob Dove, 85, American NFL defensive lineman and member of the College Football Hall of Fame.
Andrés María Rubio Garcia, 81, Uruguayan Roman Catholic bishop.
June Knox-Mawer, 75, British writer and radio broadcaster.
Ellen Kuzwayo, 91, South African author, anti-apartheid activist, and member of Parliament, diabetes.
Sir Ian Morrow, 93, British accountant and businessman.

20
Kathleen Antonelli, 85, Irish computer programmer, one of the ENIAC original computer programmers, cancer.
Cy Bahakel, 87, American media magnate.
Stanley Hiller, Jr., 81, American helicopter designer.
Igor Kuljerić, 68, Croatian composer and conductor.
Miguel Zacarías Nogaim, 101, Mexican film director.
Anna Svidersky, 17, Russian teenager, murdered while working at McDonald's, stabbed.
Wolfgang Unzicker, 80, German chess grandmaster.
Robert Wegman, 87, American businessman, chairman and former CEO of Wegmans Food Markets, Inc., philanthropist.

21
Sir Richard Bayliss, 89, British physician, Physician to the Queen (1973-1981).
Jacob Kovco, 25, first Australian Defence Force service person killed in Iraq.
T. K. Ramakrishnan, 84, Indian politician.
Telê Santana, 74, Brazilian football coach, complications from an intestinal infection.

22
 Henriette Avram, 86, American library systems analyst, developed MARC cataloging format.
Ed Davis, 89, American California State Senator and former Los Angeles police chief (1969–1978).
Enriqueta Harris, 95, English art historian.
Nobby Lawton, 65, English footballer, midfielder & former captain of Preston North End, cancer.
Jobie Nutarak, 58, Canadian politician, snowmobile accident.
Satyadeow Sawh, 50, Guyanese Minister of Fisheries, Crops and Livestock. Shot by masked gunmen.
Ronnie Sox, 67, American drag racing pioneer.
Alida Valli, 84, Italian actress (The Third Man). 
Fausto Vitello, 59, Argentine-American businessman and magazine publisher, founding publisher of the skateboarding magazine Thrasher, heart attack.

23
Ghafar Baba, 81, Malaysian former Deputy Prime Minister.
Susan Browning, 65, American actress.
Harvey Bullock, 84, American television writer and producer (The Love Boat, Love, American Style). 
Johnny Checketts, 94, New Zealand World War II flying ace.
Willie Finnigan, 93, Scottish footballer (Hibernian F.C.).
Boris Fraenkel, 85, French Trotskyist.
Barry Gibbs, 73, South Australian cricket official.
William Gottlieb, 89, American jazz photographer.
Jennifer Jayne, 74, British TV and film actress ("The Adventures of William Tell").
Florence Mars, 83, American civil rights activist, author of Witness in Philadelphia.
Ian Nelson, 50, English saxophone and clarinet musician, died in his sleep.
David Peckinpah, 54, American television producer and director, heart attack.
Phil Walden, 66, American founder of Capricorn Records, cancer.
Isaac Witkin, 69, South African-born American sculptor.

24

Erik Bergman, 94, Finnish composer.
Peter Ellis, 58, British television director.
Nasreen Pervin Huq, 47, Bangladeshi women's activist and Director of Action Aid, from getting hit by a car.
Grace Nelsen Jones, 112, American supercentenarian, Virginia's oldest person.
Brian Labone, 66, English footballer, Everton and England player, heart attack.
Bonnie Owens, 76, American country music singer.
Jimmy Sharman, 94, Australian boxing troupe impresario.
Dr. Rajkumar, 76, Legendary Indian Kannada Cinema Actor, heart attack.
Sibby Sisti, 85, American MLB player with the Boston Braves.
Steve Stavro, 78, Canadian grocery store magnate and a former owner of the Toronto Maple Leafs, heart attack.
Moshe Teitelbaum, 91, Hungarian-born Hasidic rebbe, of Satmar, one of the largest Hassidic Jewish groups in the world.

25
 Ronald Girdwood, 89, Scottish physician.
 Joseph S. Iseman, 89, American lawyer, educator and former president of Bennington College, cardiac arrest.
 Jane Jacobs, 89, American-born Canadian urban activist and author (The Death and Life of Great American Cities), stroke.
 John Kerr, 81, Irish ballad singer.
 Peter Law, 58, Welsh politician, independent MP and AM, brain tumor.
 Tabe Slioor, 79, Finnish socialite.

26

Moshe Halberstam, 74, Israeli Rabbi, Dean of Tshakava Yeshivah and prominent member of the Edah Charedis Rabbinical Court of Jerusalem.
Daryl Mack, 47, American convicted murderer, execution by lethal injection.
Yuval Ne'eman, 80, Israeli physicist, founder of the Israel Space Agency, science minister, and President of Tel Aviv University.
Russ Swan, 42, American former Major League Baseball pitcher (injuries due to a fall).

27

 Wacław Latocha, 69, Polish Olympic cyclist.
 Pat Marsden, 69, Canadian sportscaster, lung cancer.
 Strini Moodley, 60, South African founding member of Black Consciousness Movement.
Kay Noble-Bell, 65, American wrestler.
 Julia Thorne, 61, American author and first wife of John Kerry, bladder cancer.
 Mel Tom, 64, American football player, heart failure.
 Alexander Buel Trowbridge, 76, American politician and businessman, Secretary of Commerce under US President Lyndon B. Johnson from 1967 to 1968, former president of the National Association of Manufacturers.

28

Helen Armstrong, 63, American concert violinist.
 Ángel O. Berríos, 69, Puerto Rican engineer, former mayor of Caguas, heart failure.
 Steve Howe, 48, American former Major League Baseball pitcher, automobile accident.
 Jan Koetsier, 94, Dutch composer and conductor.
 Ben-Zion Orgad, 80, Israeli composer, cancer.
 M. G. G. Pillai, 67, Malaysian journalist and political activist, heart complications.

29

 Sid Barron, 88, Canadian cartoonist. Known for the biplane flying overhead trailing a banner that read "mild, isn't it.".
 William L. Durkin, 89, U.S. Marine and businessman - best known for rescuing Howard Hughes in 1946 plane crash, heart attack.
 John Kenneth Galbraith, 97, American economist and author (The Affluent Society), natural causes.
Alberta Nelson, 68, American actress known for beach party films of 1960s.
Félix Siby, 64, Gabonese politician and former government minister.
John Trever, 90, American scholar who photographed the Dead Sea Scrolls in Jerusalem.
Alvin S. White, 87, American test pilot.

30

Jay Bernstein, 69, American Hollywood publicist.
Barry Driscoll, 79, British sculptor and painter, cancer.
Jean-François Revel, 82, French philosopher.
Corinne Rey-Bellet, 33, Swiss Alpine skier, shot dead.
William (Bill) Roberts, 105, British First World War veteran.
Moshe Shmuel Shapiro, 88, Belarusian-born rabbi and Rosh Yeshiva of Yeshivas Be'er Yaakov in Israel.
Paul Spiegel, 68, German chairman of the Central Council of German Jews, natural causes.
Pramoedya Ananta Toer, 81, Indonesian writer.
Beatriz Sheridan, 71, Mexican actress and director.

References

2006-04
 04